Nandita K.C. is a Nepali actress and a professional model/actress. She is also active in social works and co-founder of a non-profit organization “We for all”. Who currently lives in the USA.
She has appeared in numerous music videos, television commercials, print ads and dozens of Nepali movies.

Early life
She was born in Narpani, Arghakhanchi-7, Nepal. She was the youngest daughter of Mr. Bhim Bahadur K.C. and Mrs. Chetkala K.C. After high school she wanted to study nursing. She didn't have plans to become an actress before she got a role in a local movie in Butwal, Western Nepal where she also learned dancing at Raj Shree Dance Center.

Filmography
Nandita K.C.'s first film was "Indreni". and she has played in more than 30 movies ever since. In the music videos sector, she was first noticed through "Sannani" sung by Babu Bogati. and by now has featured in more than a hundred music videos.
"The Yug Dekhi Yug Samma" in 2009 with opposite star cast Rajesh Hamal and "Bato Muni Ko Phool" in 2010 are among her popular movies.

Works

Awards and honors

Membership
Nandita K.C. is the Vice Treasurer at Nepal Artist Association and also a member of the Woman Empowerment Committee at Film Development Board of Nepal.

References

1983 births
Living people
Nepalese film actresses
Actresses in Nepali cinema
21st-century Nepalese actresses
People from Arghakhanchi District
Khas people